Roco Kingdom 4 is a 2015 Chinese animated fantasy adventure film directed by Hugues Martel and Dongbiao Cao and part of the Roco Kingdom film series. The film was released on August 13, 2015. It was preceded by Roco Kingdom 3 (2014).

Voice cast
Qi Zhang
Hu Xia
Ying Lin
Guan Xiaotong
Dian Tao
Jia Zhan
Lu Zhao
Xin Zhang
Beichen Liu
Baiyue
Shengbo Liu

Reception

Box office
The film earned  at the Chinese box office.

References

External links

2010s fantasy adventure films
2015 animated films
2015 films
Animated adventure films
Chinese animated fantasy films
Animated films based on video games
Tencent Pictures films